Crunch is the second album released by the glam rock band Cry Wolf.

Track listing
"Road to Ruin"
"Red Shoes"
"Face Down in the Wishing Well"
"Long Hard Road"
"On the Run"
"Stop, Look & Listen"
"Pretender"
"Dirty Dog Night"
"West Wind Blows"
"Back to You"

1990 albums
Cry Wolf (band) albums